Jennifer Sheryl Dell–Middlebrooks (born July 26, 1986) is the lead college football reporter for CBS Sports. Dell previously worked as CBS’ #2 NFL sideline reporter in 2014. She also has worked for New England Sports Network (NESN) covering the Boston Red Sox. Since 2016, she has also been the co-host of the food show Campus Eats alongside Troy Johnson on the Big Ten Network.

Personal life
After growing up in Connecticut, Dell attended college at University of Massachusetts Amherst and earned her degree in Hospitality and Tourism Management. Late in 2012, Dell began dating Will Middlebrooks, at the time the third baseman for the Red Sox. They became engaged in July 2014, and were married in February 2016. Dell and Middlebrooks had their first child, a daughter named Madison Dell Middlebrooks, in October 2018. A second daughter, Makenzie Grey, arrived in December 2019. Dell struggled to get pregnant and used fertility treatments.

References

External links

1986 births
Living people
Isenberg School of Management alumni
University of Massachusetts Amherst alumni
American sports announcers
Boston Red Sox announcers
National Football League announcers
Major League Baseball broadcasters
College football announcers
College basketball announcers in the United States
Alliance of American Football announcers
People from Southbury, Connecticut
Women sports announcers
American women television journalists
21st-century American women